Varbitsa Municipality is a municipality (obshtina) in Shumen Province, Northeastern Bulgaria, located in the vicinity of the northern slopes of the Eastern Stara planina mountain to the area of the so-called Fore-Balkan. It is named after its administrative centre - the town of Varbitsa.

The area contains the Ticha Reservoir - one of the biggest in the country, developed along the Kamchiya river. It is the reservoir with the largest perimeter in Bulgaria.

Settlements 

Varbitsa Municipality includes the following 16 places (towns are shown in bold):

Demography 
The following table shows the change of the population during the last four decades.

Ethnic composition
According to the 2011 census, among those who answered the optional question on ethnic identification, the ethnic composition of the municipality was the following:

Religion
According to the latest Bulgarian census of 2011, the religious composition, among those who answered the optional question on religious identification, was the following:

See also
Provinces of Bulgaria
Municipalities of Bulgaria
List of cities and towns in Bulgaria

References

External links
 Official website 

Municipalities in Shumen Province